East Kilbride, Strathaven and Lesmahagow is a county constituency of the House of Commons of the Parliament of the United Kingdom, which was first used in the general election of 2005. It replaced East Kilbride and some of Clydesdale, and it elects one Member of Parliament (MP) by the first past the post system of election.

Boundaries

As created by the Fifth Review of the Boundary Commission for Scotland, the constituency covers part of the South Lanarkshire council area. The rest of the council area is covered by the Dumfriesshire, Clydesdale and Tweeddale, Lanark and Hamilton East, and Rutherglen and Hamilton West. constituencies. (the Dumfriesshire, Clydesdale and Tweeddale constituency also covers part of the Dumfries and Galloway council area and part of the Scottish Borders council area).

The terms of the East Kilbride, Strathaven and Lesmahagow name refer to the towns of East Kilbride, Strathaven and Lesmahagow. However, the constituency also includes the settlements of Auldhouse, Blackwood, Caldermill, Chapelton, Drumclog, Glassford, Kirkmuirhill, Jackton,  Nerston, Stonehouse and Thorntonhall.

The following electoral wards form the constituency:

In full: Avondale and Stonehouse, East Kilbride Central North, East Kilbride Central South, East Kilbride East, East Kilbride South, East Kilbride West
In part: Clydesdale South, Clydesdale West

History 
Until the SNP landslide at the 2015 election, the constituency, and its predecessors East Kilbride, Lanark, and Clydesdale, had been represented continuously by the Labour party since the late 1950s.

Members of Parliament

Election results

Elections in the 2010s

Elections in the 2000s

References
Specific

General

Westminster Parliamentary constituencies in Scotland
Constituencies of the Parliament of the United Kingdom established in 2005
Politics of South Lanarkshire
East Kilbride